"Mr. Scarface" is the first single released from Scarface's debut album, Mr. Scarface Is Back. Produced by Crazy C and Scarface himself, "Mr. Scarface" made it to one Billboard chart, peaking at 8 on the Hot Rap Singles.

Single track listing

A-Side
"Mr. Scarface" (Radio)   
"Mr. Scarface" (Instrumental)

B-Side
"Mr. Scarface" (Club mix)   
"Mr. Scarface" (Club mix Instrumental)

1991 debut singles
Scarface (rapper) songs
Gangsta rap songs
1991 songs